District 15 of the Texas Senate is a senatorial district that currently serves a portion of Harris county in the U.S. state of Texas.

The current Senator from District 15 is John Whitmire.

Top 4 biggest cities in district
District 15 has a population of 793,108 with 574,255 that is at voting age from the 2010 census.

Election history
Election history of District 27 from 1992.

2018

2014

2012

2010

2006

2002

2000

1996

1994

1992

District officeholders

Notes

References

15
Harris County, Texas